Shabab Sabri   (born 6 July 1979 in Saharanpur, India) is a Bollywood playback singer

Shabab Sabri's father Iqbal Sabri and uncle Afzal Sabri were qawalli and Sufi singers in India. Shabab Sabri began training under Rashid Khan Saheb at the age of 14 years. Later on Sabri learned and performed in many live shows with his father.

Sabri began his work as a playback singer in 1998 for song "Teri Jawani badi mast mast hai" with his father and uncle.

As a playback singer

Awards

References

External links 

 Shabab Sabri spreading his magic with Jadu Tonewaliyan of Daawat-E Ishq
 Shabab Sabri chosen over Rahet Fateh Ali Khan
 Shabab-Sabri
 SHABABSABRI INSTGRAM

1979 births
Living people
Indian playback singers
Bollywood playback singers
20th-century Indian male singers
20th-century Indian singers
20th-century Indian Muslims
21st-century Indian male singers
21st-century Indian singers
Chishti-Sabiris